Chakhei or Chakhang is one of the villages/towns in Southern part of India's north-eastern state of Mizoram within Mara Autonomous District Council. The inhabitants are mostly Chapi /Hawthai Sizo dialect speaking Mara (Hawthai) tribe who were earlier known to outsiders as Lakher, Zochhia, Miram and Shendu.

Tourist attractions 
1. Mount Mawma: The highest mountain within Mara Autonomous District Council is just 2 km above this town. It is the third highest peak in Mizoram state. During winter one can see a huge dam in Bangladesh from the peak of Mt. Mawma. Rare flowers like Rhododendrons adorn this mountain. From here many Burmese villages across the border are visible too.

2. Nazareth Vaih: A street named after Nazareth in the Holy Bible, which is the name of the town in Israel, the place where Jesus Christ was raised up, is somehow an attraction for visitors from outside.

3. Farms : Farms are another attraction for tourists and visitors.

4. River Kaladan: 15 km from the town lies the biggest river in the state. Fishing is fun and adventurous at this river. You may meet many Burmese in this river too. Locally it is known as Beino or Bieno. This is also a great place to picnic with friends and relatives alike.

Transportations & Communications 
Chakhei town lies 75 km east of Siaha town, the district headquarters. There is daily Mini-Bus service from September to July. During July to September, the service is temporarily suspended due to bad road, the danger of landslide is imminent during rainy reason. However, pick-up vehicles and private small vehicles still ply on the road during the rainy season as well.

Education 
There are three government aided primary schools, one English medium school known as Chakhei English School, one middle school and one High School.

Border & Trade 
Chakhei town lies 15 km from India-Myanmar border and overlooks River Kolodyne, the biggest river in Mizoram state. Due to its close proximity to the border unofficial trade is happening at this town. For many Chin people in the other side of the border, Chakhei becomes another place for them to buy their daily necessities from India.

Main income 
Most people are depending on the harvest from their farms and fields. Around 20 per cent of them are government employees in various departments.

Notable people 
 Shri Laima Chozah, IAS, Commissioner, Income Tax, Gov't of West Bengal, India.
 Shri KT Beicho, IRAS, Dy FA&CAO, Guwahati, Assam, India.
 Shri K. Riachho, MCS, IAS, Secy FCS&C, Gov't of Mizoram. Former DC of Champhai, Lunglei, etc.
 Shri KT Rokhaw, former MLA, Mizoram, India.
 Shri K. Hrahmo, EM (Edu), MADC, Mizoram, India.
 Shri C. Zakia, composer, educationist, retired m/s teacher.
 Rev. Joseph Retau, Missiologist, Tokyo, Japan.
 Pastor C. Khaisa, Assam, etc.
 BeiRokhu Beita, founder of Maraland.net
 K. Laltlawmlova, Mizoram Civil Service (MCS). 
 Abraham Beirazi Khithie, Mizoram Civil Service (MCS).

External links
 Chakhei.com Chakhei town online site

Saiha
Cities and towns in Saiha district